Whitecourt-Ste. Anne was a provincial electoral district in Alberta, Canada mandated to return a single member to the Legislative Assembly of Alberta using the first-past-the-post method of voting from 1993 to 2019.

Communities within the boundaries of the Whitecourt-Ste. Anne electoral district include Mayerthorpe, Onoway and Whitecourt.

History
The district was created in 1993 from the previous Whitecourt, Stony Plain and a portion of Barrhead electoral districts.

The 2010 electoral boundary re-distribution saw land north of Alberta Highway 16 from within Stony Plain transferred to this district.

Boundary history

Representation history

The electoral district was created in 1993 primarily from the districts of Whitecourt and Stony Plain. Long-time Progressive Conservative incumbent Peter Trynchy, who had been in the legislature since 1971 and held numerous cabinet portfolios, ran for re-election that year. Trynchy faced a tough fight to keep his seat from Liberal candidate Jurgen Preugschas. Trynchy ran for his final term in office in the 1997 election. He won a large majority to easily retain his seat.

The second member to represent the riding is George VanderBurg. He was elected to his first term with a landslide majority in the 2001 general election. He won a second term with a greatly reduced margin in the 2004 general election. VanderBurg was appointed to a cabinet portfolio in the Alberta government for the first time in 2006. He won his third term in office with a larger margin against Senator-in-waiting Link Byfield in the 2008 general election. In the 2012 general election, he retained his seat for a fourth term in office by a narrow margin over the Wildrose candidate, Maryann Chichak.

VanderBurg lost the seat in the 2015 general election to Oneil Carlier of the NDP, falling to third place behind Wildrose candidate John Bos. Following his election victory, Carlier was named Minister of Agriculture and Forestry in the new government.

Legislature results

1993 general election

1997 general election

2001 general election

2004 general election

2008 general election

2012 general election

2015 general election

Senate nominee results

2004 Senate nominee election district results
Voters had the option of selecting 4 Candidates on the Ballot

2012 Senate nominee election district results

Student Vote results

2004 election

On November 19, 2004, a Student Vote was conducted at participating Alberta schools to parallel the 2004 Alberta general election results. The vote was designed to educate students and simulate the electoral process for persons who have not yet reached the legal majority. The vote was conducted in 80 of the 83 provincial electoral districts with students voting for actual election candidates. Schools with a large student body that reside in another electoral district had the option to vote for candidates outside of the electoral district then where they were physically located.

2012 election

See also
List of Alberta provincial electoral districts

References

Further reading

External links
Elections Alberta
The Legislative Assembly of Alberta

Former provincial electoral districts of Alberta
Whitecourt